= Bolttsia =

Scientific classification
- Domain: Eukaryota
- Kingdom: Animalia
- Phylum: Arthropoda
- Class: Malacostraca
- Order: Amphipoda
- Family: Bolttsiidae
- Genus: Bolttsia; Griffiths, 1976

Family of crustaceans

Bolttsia is a genus of crustaceans belonging to the monotypic family Bolttsiidae.

The species of this genus are found in Southern Africa and Australia.

Species:

- Bolttsia minuta Griffiths, 1976
- Bolttsia myersi Azman & Lowry, 2009
